Stigens IF is a Swedish football club located in Stigen.

Background
Stigens IF currently plays in Division 5 Dalsland which is the seventh tier of Swedish football. They play their home matches at the Nya Stigevi in Stigen.

The club is affiliated to Dalslands Fotbollförbund. Stigens IF have competed in the Svenska Cupen on 2 occasions and have played 2 matches in the competition.

Season to season

In their most successful period Stigens IF  competed in the following divisions:

In recent seasons Stigens IF  have competed in the following divisions:

Footnotes

External links
 Stigens IF – Official website

Football clubs in Västra Götaland County